Alting is a surname, and may refer to:
 Bart Carpentier Alting (born 1954)
 Jacob Alting (1618–1679), Dutch philologist and theologian
 Johann Heinrich Alting (1583–1644), minister
 Menso Alting (1541–1612), Dutch Reformed preacher and reformer
 Ron Alting, a member of the Indiana State Senate
 Willem Arnold Alting (1724–1800), Dutch colonial administrator

See also
 Althing, the national parliament of Iceland